Port Hedland Power Station is a natural gas-fired power station in Western Australia.  It consists of five 42MW gas-fired turbine units located in two separate locations: two units are located at the BHP Billiton hot briquetted iron plant at Boodarie which has been decommissioned; and three units are located in a standalone facility at Port Hedland, connected by a 66kV transmission line. The assets are operated from a central control point allowing them to operate as an integrated plant and Port Hedland is connected to the North West Interconnected System.

Three dual fuel units were commissioned in 1995; two additional units were subsequently commissioned in 1998.

See also 

 Alinta Energy

External links 
Alinta Energy generation

Natural gas-fired power stations in Western Australia
Port Hedland, Western Australia